This list of traditional armaments tries to include all "traditional" armaments. Essentially anything that is wieldable, excluding "modern" (post American civil war) firearms. It lists everything by typology in easy-to-reference tables for your searching convenience.

This catalog does not however presume to list every dialectal variant for the word spear, sword, etc. It only attempts to provide a broad range of designs or unique characteristics of various arms of historical or regional significance, i.e. items that stand out from the standard norm. This catalog may include some modern examples but it tries to lean towards weapons of the past.

For mythological or fictional arms see:

 :Category:Mythological weapons
 :Category:Fictional weapons
 :Category:Fictional swords

How to read this table
Martial uses
 Implement – (main use is a tool/but has been "known" to be used in battle or modified as a poor-mans weapon) 
 War – (battle tested and usually standard issue)
 Practice – (hardly functional/can still be dangerous)
 Civilian – (impracticable for warfare/battlefields, similar to martial art category but not as formalized. primarily used as a deterrent; for self-protection or dueling)
 Improvised – (makeshift or grabbing/but recorded to have been used)
 Martial art – (dueling and sparring/more likely to see it in a school than on the battlefield)
 Historic – (not a type but a "named" blade or of historical significance)
 Ceremony/ornament – (Main purpose is not as a weapon, but it isn't a toy either)
 Parry – (A parrying knife/ "sword breaker" Typically used off-hand; Paired with a main weapon to shield from incoming blows, counterattack or disarm)
 Relic – (surviving example of the ancient past, historic and precious )

First column header Prime example for comparison (weapon style/usage notation)

Era
 ANCIENT – Dawn of civilization stone/Bronze Age
 ANTIQUITY – (Mediterranean) Time of Greek & Roman states. roughly Iron Age
 MEDIEVAL – (Europe) Middle Ages 476 AD to 1450 AD
 RENAISSANCE – (Europe) 14th–16th centuries Europe
 MODERN – came into use fairly recently in the human time line
 TRADITIONAL – Modern use with roots in the distant past

#top

Synonyms
 Throwing axes – labeled under tomahawks
 Boomerang – labeled as a shuriken
 Wooden swords – considered a club or truncheon based on overall shape
 Cane sword – under rapier heading due to its blade function.
 Shikomizue – under long truncheons due to its scabbard form.
#top

Pole arms and staff weapons
A pole with a weaponized tip; often used to counter mounted cavalry or to aid in infantry charges. Their benefit is their reach. Their hindrance is they are often hard to wield and transport, and tie up both hands; this usually leads to the need of a backup weapon such as a sword.

Surmounted "spear-like" head
conical(spiked) or triangular (dagger) tipped – used primarily for impaling

Lances/Cavalry

#top

Pikes/Infantry

:Category:Bayonets—Modern rifle pikes

#top

Javelins/Throwing/Skirmish

#top

Spear, Trident/Hunting, War

#top

Surmounted "sword-like" tip

Sabre shaped

#top

Cleaver shaped

#top

Concave edge/Falcate

#top

Surmounted "axe-style" tip

#top

Surmounted hammer/mace/Pick

#top

Battle staves/counterbalanced

#top

Man catchers/indirect lethality

#top

Hafted/fitted onto handles
 Socketed heads, fitted on a short staff or stick carved into a handle "HELVE" 

 Used to break armor, shields, and bone by virtue of kinetic impact 

wedge-shaped or crescent-edged blade used to cleave

Hafted one-handed
Can be thrown or wielded, hafted weapons consist of a heavy head inset on a short handle and are used to deliver powerful blows

Tomahawks/hammers/picks

#top

Maces

#top

Hafted/two hander
Longer helve to accommodate two hands and a heavier tip

Axes/battle axes

#top

Hammers/Mauls/Pickaxes

#top

Hafted-like/short pole mounted

#top

Hilted blades/fitted into handles

Tang fitted into a handle, can often have hand guards

Knives

#top

Daggers

#top

Short swords/long knives
The iffy category between dagger and knife and sword. Most chopping backswords are here as well as daggers over 12"

Stabbers

#top

Chopping sword

#top

Swords-one handed

 Korean sword – overview—Types & history
 Backsword – overview—Sabre type
 Bronze Age swords – overview—Sword beats club
 Iron Age swords – overview—they rust
 Sverd – overview—Viking type
 Migration Period sword—Viking sword stub
Oakeshott typology -- 13 Medieval blade designs
 Sword of State—Symbol of many monarchies

Curved/sabre-like

 :Category:British Service Swords – modern sabers
#top

Straight/Jian-like

#top

Rapier-like/Dueling swords

#top

Sword-like/hooked/warped

#top

Two-handed swords
The two-handed sword's hilt is long enough to accommodate both hands; to increase thrust or chop power. Many can be held with just one hand but are more effective with two

Katana/2-handed sabres

#top

Longsword/2H Thrust & hack

#top

Hand-and-half swords

#top

Great swords/horse killers

#top

Loaded fists
Enhances punching power by increasing mass of the hand or concentrating force onto a smaller area

Blunt, more or less

#top

Bladed fist

#top

Bludgeons/clubs
blunt (but not always) weapons. traditionally fabricated from naturally originating material, often using only stoneage technology. Primarily used to cause deep tissue damage (contusions) rather than cuts.

Truncheons/canes/Stick-shaped

#top

Clubs/Widening end

Clubs tend to be hefty and sturdy; typically graduating from a handle to a weighted tip of larger size. Some have an edge that can split open a head. Normally fabricated from a single piece of wood. 

#top

Two handed clubs/bats

Tend to be heavier and less balanced than the quarter staff, usually made from a single piece of hardened wood or other material. Typically too short to be considered a polearm and too off-balance to be effectively used with only one hand 

#top

Soft and segmented weapons
 "soft" as opposed to "rigid" weapons. Typically they consist of a handle and a weaponized tip attached to each other by a flexible body of rope, chain, etc. This gives them a longer reach or incorporates mechanical advantage to increase momentum and thus striking power. The trade-off is that they are more difficult to control and may harm nearby allies or even the wielder himself. they also require open space so not to be snagged on or impeded by nearby obstacles and thus rendered ineffective.

Scourges/short tongs

#top

Whips/long lash

#top

Rope darts/Meteor hammers

#top

Flails/Segmented weapons

#top

Oddities/Hard to classify
Just too fantastic to believe, but there is truth in it

#top

Throwing objects
Uses nothing but old fashioned muscle power, but may utilize a tool for extra leverage

Slings/atlatls/device aided

#top

Shurikens/grenades
 Knife throwing – Overview – Info

#top

Ranged weapons

Objects launched by an engine/device held in hand that impart a velocity unattainable if thrown

Bows/Cross-bows

Composite bow – overview
Crossbow – overview

#top

Blow guns and other Ejecters

#top

Firearms/muskets
Projectiles often formed from lead and in various shapes; launched by a device using the force of expanding gas created from the burning of black powder (gunpowder) contained in a semi-sealed tube
 Gunpowder – overview—Learn about this amazing compound.
 Muskets – overview—Learn about Muzzle loaders.
 Carbine – overview—concerning article
 Single-shot—concerning article
 :Category:Firearm components—general info.
 :Category:Early firearms—more information
 matchlock—trigger type
 Doglock—trigger type
 Flintlock—trigger type
 snaplock—trigger type
 wheellock—trigger type

Pistols/short barrel
 Hand cannon – overview—learn about the first guns
 Handgun – overview – what constitutes a handgun..Main article

#top

Shouldered guns/long barrel
 List of Springfield rifles/muskets

#top

Bullets/Missiles/Projectiles

 Ammunition—general info

#top

Passive weapons/Anti personnel/Area denial

#top

Armor
 Armour – overview – Types and history
 Mail armour – overview – Types and history.
 Ringmail – overview – What is ringmail?
 Chinese armour – overview – Style and history.
Components of medieval armour—An alternate table.

 Anything worn for protection but not considered as typical clothing

Head/face

#top

Torso

#top

Shoulder and arms

#top

Waist and Seat
Help to ensure heirs and to attach sidearms

#top

Legs

#top

Hands and Feet

#top

Shields

#top

Accessories

brooches/clasps/baldrics/banners/trumps

#top

Armor sets

#top

Terminology
 Sword
 saif- a sword
 Daito-Japanese for longsword
 Dao- Chinese for a sabre
 Jian- Chinese for a straightsword
 Ken- Japanese for a straightsword
 Golok (a catch-all for several types of sword and knife)
 Blade
 serrated blade
 ricasso- Dull edge, blade section
 Forte- Strong blade section
 Foible- Weak blade section
 Fuller - blood groove, reduce weight
 Fluke- spike/pick mounted on back of an axehead
 Peen - hammer head
 Hilt- sword handle
 quillon-cross guard
 Tsuba- plate style guard
 Habaki-Japan style rain guard
 Scabbard-Sheath, sword case
 Shirasaya -Japan name
 Etching
 Engraving
 Scrimshaw
 Horimono-Japan style
 Equipment style
 Daisho-samurai, long & short
 Jintachi- Mounting

List of martial art/styles
weapon play
 List of martial arts
 Academic fencing
 List of Roman gladiator types

top

Trad